Ataula was a Spanish and Catalan restaurant in Portland, Oregon, in the United States. The restaurant earned Jose Chesa a James Beard Foundation Award nomination in the Best Chef: Northwest category.

Description 
Ataula was a Spanish and Catalan restaurant on 21st Avenue in northwest Portland's Northwest District. Lonely Planet described the business as an "upmarket eatery offering a modern take on traditional Spanish tapas".

The menu included a version of patatas bravas called Nuestras Bravas, rabbit paella, ribs ibérico, chorizo lollipops, cod fritters, and coca bread with olive oil and shredded tomato. The restaurant also served octopus carpaccio and cured salmon with mascarpone yogurt and black truffle honey. Michael Russell of The Oregonian described the rossejat negre as "toasted and squid-ink-blackened noodles topped with a healthy scoop of roast garlic alioli". For Burger Week, the restaurant served a tapas-style beef hamburger.

On the drink menu, the El Greco Tonica had gin and the La Moreneta was "made with mezcal bitter blend, vermút and flamed orange", according to Willamette Week.

History 
The restaurant opened in 2013, in a space which previously housed Patanegra. Guy Fieri visited the restaurant on Diners, Drive-Ins and Dives.

Owners confirmed plans to close permanently in April 2021, during the COVID-19 pandemic.

Reception 
In 2014, Micheal C. Zusman of Willamette Week wrote, "In recent months, Ataula has sharpened its angle of ascent, breaking into the ranks of Portland's elite restaurants. The floor staff is among the best in town; the kitchen kills it every night, getting dishes properly cooked and out quickly; and, my oh my, the food." The restaurant earned Jose Chesa a James Beard Foundation Award nomination in the Best Chef: Northwest category. Michael Russell included Ataula in The Oregonian's 2017 lists of the city's 40 best restaurants, ten best restaurants in northwest Portland, and ten best Spanish restaurants in the city. Larry Bleiberg included the business in USA Today's 2018 list of "great places" to try a Moscow mule.

See also
 Hispanics and Latinos in Portland, Oregon
 Impact of the COVID-19 pandemic on the restaurant industry in the United States
 List of defunct restaurants of the United States
 List of Spanish restaurants

References

2013 establishments in Oregon
2021 disestablishments in Oregon
Catalan restaurants
Defunct European restaurants in Portland, Oregon
Northwest District, Portland, Oregon
Restaurants disestablished during the COVID-19 pandemic
Restaurants disestablished in 2021
Restaurants established in 2013
Spanish restaurants in the United States
Spanish-American culture in Portland, Oregon